Florinda Chico Martín-Mora MML (24 April 1926 – 19 February 2011) was a Spanish actress of film, theater and television.

Biography
Florinda Chico Martín-Mora was born in 1926 in Don Benito (Badajoz) in Extremadura, Spain. She studied singing and then started her artistic career on the stage acting in musical revues. Her first successes were El huevo and the revue La blanca doble (1947) with the comedian trio Zori, Santos y Codeso.  Although she made her debut on cinema in 1953 with the movie Pasaporte para un ángel it wasn't until the late 1960s that she became famous in Spain.

She often played the roles of feisty, fleshy housewife or grumpy maid. She worked with director Mariano Ozores in almost two dozen films. She also appeared in such dramas as Cría cuervos (1976) and La casa de Bernarda Alba (1987).

She was also a regular on such television series as La tía de Ambrosio (1971), Los maniáticos (1974), Este señor de negro (1975–76), de Antonio Mercero, Taller mecánico (1991), El sexólogo (1994), Makinavaja (1995–96) and La casa de los líos (1996–2000). In the 1980s she appeared in the theater play Mi tía y sus cosas.

Florinda died on 19 February 2011 in Madrid at age 84 of a strong respiratory disease.

Selected filmography

Movies
 1953 – Plot on the Stage 
 1973 – La descarriada as Angustias
 1975 – Unmarried Mothers 
 1976 – Cría cuervos
 1980 – Y al tercer año, resucitó
 1980 – Spoiled Children 
 1987 – La casa de Bernarda Alba as Poncia
 1988 – Jarrapellejos

Honours 
 Gold Medal of Merit in Labour (Kingdom of Spain, 19 December 1997).

References

1926 births
2011 deaths
Spanish stage actresses
Spanish film actresses
Spanish television actresses
Spanish vedettes
Actresses from Madrid
Respiratory disease deaths in Spain